Benjamin Jake Twohig (born 13 April 1998) is an English cricketer. He made his first-class debut on 4 May 2018, for Worcestershire in the 2018 County Championship. He made his List A debut for Worcestershire against the West Indies A in a tri-series warm-up match on 19 June 2018.

References

External links
 

1998 births
Living people
English cricketers
Worcestershire cricketers
English cricketers of the 21st century
Cricketers from Dewsbury